Qeshlaq-e Ilkhchi-ye Olya (also Romanized as Qeshlāq-e Īlkhchī-ye ‘Olyā; also known as Qeshlāq-e Īlchī-ye ‘Olyā) is a village in Azadlu Rural District, Muran District, Germi County, Ardabil Province, Iran. At the 2006 census, its population was 80, in 15 families.

References 

Towns and villages in Germi County